USS Shirin (SP-915) was a United States Navy patrol vessel in commission from 1917 to 1918.

Shirin was built as a private motorboat of the same name in 1896 by the Gas Engine and Power Company at Morris Heights in the Bronx, New York. On 23 May 1917, the U.S. Navy acquired her from her owner, S. T. Rhea, Jr., of New Orleans, Louisiana, for use as a section patrol boat during World War I. She was commissioned as USS Shirin (SP-915) on 2 June 1917.

Shirin patrolled at New Orleans and in the vicinity of Pensacola, Florida, for the rest of World War I.

Shirin was decommissioned at New Orleans on 18 December 1918. She was sold on 29 June 1921 to Stewart McDonald of St. Louis, Missouri.

References

SP-915 Shirin at Department of the Navy Naval History and Heritage Command Online Library of Selected Images: U.S. Navy Ships -- Listed by Hull Number "SP" #s and "ID" #s -- World War I Era Patrol Vessels and other Acquired Ships and Craft numbered from SP-900 through SP-999
NavSource Online: Section Patrol Craft Photo Archive Shirin (SP 915)

Patrol vessels of the United States Navy
World War I patrol vessels of the United States
Ships built in Morris Heights, Bronx
1896 ships